Bushra Anjum Butt (born 17 July 1981) is a Pakistani politician who was a Member of the Provincial Assembly of the Punjab, from July 2013 to May 2018.

Early life and education

She was born on 17 July 1981 in Lahore. In 2009, she earned a Master of Arts degree in English from Kinnaird College for Women University.

Political career

She was elected to the Provincial Assembly of the Punjab as a candidate of Pakistan Muslim League (N) (PML-N) on a reserved seat for women in July 2013.

She was re-elected to the Provincial Assembly of the Punjab as a candidate of PML-N on a reserved seat for women in 2018 Pakistani general election.

References

Living people
Punjab MPAs 2013–2018
Women members of the Provincial Assembly of the Punjab
1981 births
Pakistan Muslim League (N) MPAs (Punjab)
Kinnaird College for Women University alumni
21st-century Pakistani women politicians